Duško Antunović (24 February 1947 – 16 February 2012) was a Croatian water polo player and coach. He competed for Yugoslavia at the 1972 and 1976 Summer Olympics.

References

1947 births
2012 deaths
Croatian male water polo players
Croatian water polo coaches
Yugoslav male water polo players
Olympic water polo players of Yugoslavia
Water polo players at the 1972 Summer Olympics
Water polo players at the 1976 Summer Olympics
People from Korčula
Antunović, Duško